Kateřina Baďurová (born 18 December 1982 in Ostrava), also known as Kateřina Janků, is a Czech former pole vaulter.

She finished twelfth at the 2004 Olympic Games. She also competed at the 2004 World Indoor Championships and the European Championships in 2002 and 2006 without reaching the finals.

Her best success came at the 2007 World Championships in Athletics in Osaka, Japan, where she took silver for 4.75 m vault, setting new Czech national record. She took early retirement from the sport due to a serious rupture of the ligament in her left knee. After retirement, she planned to continue in the field of child physiotherapy.

Since 2010 she works as an athletic head coach.

Personal life
In 2010, Baďurová married Czech high jumper, Tomáš Janků. In 2007, Janků presented Baďurová with 465 roses at a press conference after she set a new national record in the pole vault of 465cm. The pair have two daughters Ellen (born 2012) and Nikolet (born 2014).

She won StarDance, the Czech version of Dancing with the Stars, in 2012.

References

External links
 
 
 
 
 

1982 births
Living people
Czech female pole vaulters
Czech athletics coaches
Czech female dancers
Olympic athletes of the Czech Republic
Athletes (track and field) at the 2004 Summer Olympics
Athletes (track and field) at the 2008 Summer Olympics
World Athletics Championships medalists
World Athletics Championships athletes for the Czech Republic
Sportspeople from Ostrava